Veljko Ostojić (born 13 October 1958) is a Croatian politician. 

Ostojić was named minister of tourism as the lone member of the Istrian Democratic Assembly (IDS) in the cabinet of Zoran Milanović on 23 December 2011. On 9 March 2013 he resigned due to media revelations of his family profiting from a sale of land due to a change in planning laws in the IDS governed Istria County.

References

Living people
1958 births
Tourism ministers of Croatia
Istrian Democratic Assembly politicians
People from Pazin